Klaus Weiß (20 November 1944 – 8 June 2000) was an East German former handball player who competed in the 1972 Summer Olympics. He was born in Breslau. In 1972 he was part of the East German team which finished fourth in the Olympic tournament. He played four matches.

References

External links
 

1944 births
2000 deaths
German male handball players
Olympic handball players of East Germany
Handball players at the 1972 Summer Olympics
Sportspeople from Wrocław